Butcher paper is a type of kraft paper originally sold to butchers for the purpose of wrapping meat and fish. It is now used for a wide variety of purposes, notably in primary education where it is used for arts and crafts, such as hanging artwork. Many high schools use butchers' paper for posters of clubs, and upcoming events. It is a cheap but sturdy paper that is sold in large rolls. Butcher paper is usually white or reddish in colour, made from kraft pulp, and is generally considered to have a density of between 30 lb/3000 sq ft (49 g/m2) and 50 lb/3000 sq ft (81 g/m2).

Moving companies use butcher paper to pack china, glass, and other fragile items for safe transport. The use of printed paper, such as newspaper, could transfer ink onto the packaged item causing damage.

References

External links
 What is The True Difference Between Kraft Paper and Butcher Paper?

Paper
Food preparation utensils